The 1957 NCAA University Division basketball tournament involved 23 schools playing in single-elimination play to determine the national champion of men's college basketball in the NCAA University Division, replaced in 1973 by NCAA Division I. The 1956–57 school year was the first in which NCAA members were formally divided into separate competitive levels, with larger and more competitive athletic programs placed in the University Division and smaller programs placed in the College Division (which would be replaced by NCAA Division II and NCAA Division III in 1973).

The 19th edition of the NCAA tournament began on March 11, 1957, and ended with the championship game on March 23 in Kansas City, Missouri. A total of 27 games were played, including a third-place game in each region and a national third-place game. North Carolina, coached by Frank McGuire, won the national title with a 54–53 triple-overtime victory in the final game over Kansas, coached by Dick Harp. Wilt Chamberlain of Kansas became the fourth player to be named the tournament's Most Outstanding Player despite not playing for the championship team.

Tournament notes
North Carolina won two consecutive triple overtime games to win the championship. The North Carolina – Michigan State semi final game and North Carolina – Kansas final game both made USA Todays list of the greatest NCAA tournament games of all time at 11 and 6 respectively.

Locations

For the seventh time, Kansas City and the Municipal Auditorium hosted the Final Four. This tied the record, with Madison Square Garden, of hosting the most Final Fours in a single arena all-time, a record it would break in 1961 and which it still holds today. Once again, four new sites were used for the tournament. In the Midwest Regional, Southern Methodist University and the city of Dallas hosted tournament games for the first time at the SMU Coliseum, in its first year of operation. This marked the first games ever in the state of Texas, and the first in the Dallas-Fort Worth Metroplex. Three of the first round sites were also new. In Columbus, another new building, St. John Arena on the campus of Ohio State University, hosted games for the first time, the first games held in the state of Ohio. The state of Idaho became the first of the western mountain states to host games, at Reed Gymnasium on the campus of Idaho State College in Pocatello. And for the second time in three years, Oklahoma City University hosted the first round at a high school gymnasium, this time at the Capitol Hill High School Gym, a 4,000 seat gym in the southern part of the city. The city would not host games again for twenty years, until the Myriad Convention Center began hosting tournament games. This would also be the only time Reed Gym would host games; subsequent games in Pocatello would be hosted at the Minidome, its successor as home to the Bengals men's basketball team.

Teams

Bracket
* – Denotes overtime period

East region

Mideast region

Midwest region

West region

Final Four

See also
 1957 NCAA College Division basketball tournament
 1957 National Invitation Tournament
 1957 NAIA Basketball Tournament

References

NCAA Division I men's basketball tournament
NCAA Division I men's basketball tournament
NCAA University Division basketball tournament
NCAA University Division basketball tournament
College sports tournaments in Missouri
Basketball competitions in Kansas City, Missouri